Mark Koussas is a former Australian international football player. He is married to his wife Faye and has two children; Maree and James.

He was awarded the Adidas Golden Boot having scored four goals in the 1981 FIFA World Youth Championship. He is of Greek descent.

He played for Sydney Olympic F.C. and APIA Leichhardt Tigers during his career. He made at least two full international appearances for the Socceroos making his debut against Indonesia in August 1981. During his time as a player at Sydney Olympic, he was in full-time education working towards becoming a computer programmer.

References 

1963 births
Australian soccer players
Australian people of Greek descent
Sydney Olympic FC players
Australia international soccer players
Living people
Soccer players from Sydney
Association football midfielders
Sportsmen from New South Wales